Gymnopilus palmicola is a species of mushroom in the family Hymenogastraceae.

Description

This species does not stain blue and therefore probably does not contain hallucinogenic compounds.

Habitat and distribution
Gymnopilus palmicola grows on palm logs and on living orchids. It has been found in Cuba, Mexico, and Florida between March and September.

See also
List of Gymnopilus species

References

External links
Gymnopilus palmicola at Index Fungorum

palmicola
Fungi of North America
Taxa named by William Alphonso Murrill